The 2016 Italian local elections were held on 5 June, with a run-off, where necessary if a candidate for Mayor obtained less than 50 percent of votes in the first round, held on 19 June.

In Trentino-Alto Adige the elections were held on 8 May (second round on 22 May), in Aosta Valley on 15 May. Municipal councilors and mayors ordinarily serve a term of five years.

Voting system
All mayoral elections in Italy in cities with a population higher than 15,000 use the same system.

Under this system voters express a direct choice for the mayor or an indirect choice voting for one of the parties of the candidate's coalition. If no candidate receives a majority of votes, the top two candidates go to a second round two weeks later. The coalition of the elected mayor is guaranteed a majority of seats in the council with the attribution of extra seats, but the majority bonus system is not adopted by the cities of Trentino-Alto Adige. If a Mayor resigns, dies or is ousted from office after more than half the municipal councillors stepped down, an early municipal election (for the Mayor and for all municipal councillors) is called.

The City Council is elected at the same time as the mayor. Voters can vote for a list of candidates and can express up to two preferences for candidates of said list. In case of two preferences, they must be given to candidates of both genders. Seats are the attributed to parties proportionally, and for each party the candidates with the highest number of preferences are elected.

Opinion polling

Results

Overall results 
Majority of each coalition in 149 municipalities (comuni) with a population higher than 15,000:

Notes: almost all political parties and coalitions in local (municipal and regional) elections usually run with the support of some minor allied list active in local politics forming coalitions under the same nominee as the mayoral candidate, only M5S ran in all elections with a single list (that is the M5S list with its mayoral candidate without forming coalitions with minor local lists or other national parties). A civic list (lista civica) is a local list.

By party
Party votes in the main 132 municipalities:

By coalition
Coalition results in the main municipalities:

Mayoral election results

See also
2016 Bologna municipal election
2016 Milan municipal election
2016 Naples municipal election
2016 Rome municipal election
2016 Turin municipal election

References and notes

2016 elections in Italy
 
 
Municipal elections in Italy
June 2016 events in Italy